A. B. Jackson (born Alexander Brooks Jackson, April 18, 1925 – March 23, 1981) was an American painter.

Life and career
Jackson was born in New Haven, Connecticut, the son of a black father and an English mother who was born in Manchester, England. He earned BFA and MFA degrees from Yale University, studying with Josef Albers in the mid-1950s. Before entering the teaching field, he spent three years as a designer in the Watson-Manning Advertising Agency in Stratford, Connecticut.

He taught briefly at Southern University in Baton Rouge, Louisiana in 1955, before moving to Norfolk, Virginia in 1956. In 1967, after teaching 10 years at Norfolk State, he joined Old Dominion University (ODU) as a full professor and its first black faculty member.

During his teaching years, Jackson also exhibited his art in many local and neighboring venues. After being denied entry to the Virginia Beach Boardwalk Art show in 1962 because of his race, he won best-in-show there in 1966. He received significant attention in 1968 when several of his drawings were included in a Smithsonian Institution traveling art exhibition.

Influenced by Rembrandt, Jackson worked in a range of materials, including watercolors, pastels, charcoal and acrylic. His series of paintings "The Porch People" depicts anonymous sitters on their porches in Ghent, the district of Norfolk, Virginia, where he lived. His book As I See Ghent: A Visual Essay was published in 1979.

Jackson died in 1981 at the age of 55.

He is represented in the permanent collections of: 
Mint Museum of Art
University of Virginia
Yale University
Harvard University
Dartmouth College Museum
Howard University     
North Carolina State University    
Old Dominion University
Longwood College
Louisiana Arts & Sciences Museum
Muscarelle Museum of Art    
Virginia Museum of Fine Arts     
Chrysler Museum of Art     
Smithsonian Institution

Legacy
Passerby: An A.B. Jackson Retrospective showed at ODU's Baron and Ellin Gordon Art Galleries from May 23 to August 2, 2015.

Personal life 
Jackson was the maternal grandfather of professional American football quarterback Russell Wilson.

References

External links
"The Papers of A.B. Jackson: Biography", Special Collections & University Archives, Old Dominion University Libraries.
 "Norfolk Artist AB Jackson, Porch People and Passersby Video". YouTube.
"Alexander Brooks 'A.B.' Jackson", Special Collections and University Archives Wiki, Old Dominion University Libraries

20th-century American painters
Yale School of Art alumni
Old Dominion University faculty
American people of English descent
1981 deaths
1925 births
20th-century African-American painters
20th-century American male artists
Artists from New Haven, Connecticut
Painters from Connecticut